Eutropis floweri, also known commonly as Flower's skink, Taylor's skink and Taylor's striped mabuya, is a species of lizard in the family Scincidae. The species is endemic to the island of Sri Lanka.

Habitat & Geographic range
E. floweri is found in arid northeastern Sri Lanka (Trincomalee District), and in forest in central Sri Lanka.

Description
E. floweri is a small, terrestrial skink. Its dorsal scales are tricarinate. The midbody scale rows number 30-32. The smooth ventral scale rows number 12. The dorsum is olive brown, with a greenish white dorso-lateral stripe running from eye to the base of the tail. There is a series of 20 paired short black narrow transverse markings running from shoulder to tail. The venter is light with a greenish cast.

References

Further reading
Somaweera R, Somaweera N (2009). Lizards of Sri Lanka, A Colour Guide with Field Keys. Frankfurt am Main: Edition Chimaira / Serpents Tale. 304 pp. .
Taylor EH (1950). "Ceylonese Lizards of the Family Scincidae". University of Kansas Science Bulletin 33 (2): 481–518. (Mabuya floweri, new species, pp. 487–489).
Taylor EH (1953). "A Review of the Lizards of Ceylon". Univ. Kansas Sci. Bull. 35 (2): 1525–1585. (Mabuya floweri, p. 1575).

External links
 http://srisalike.com/Fauna/Reptiles/Endemic/Eutropis%20floweri.aspx
 https://web.archive.org/web/20150220085810/http://www.srilankanreptiles.com/TetrapodReptiles/Scincidae.html
 Das I, de Silva A, Austin CC (2008). "A new skink found from Sri Lanka". Zootaxa 1700: 35–52. (Eutropis floweri, new combination, pp. 46–47).

Reptiles of Sri Lanka
Eutropis
Reptiles described in 1950
Taxa named by Edward Harrison Taylor